Wilbarger County Airport  is a county-owned, public-use airport in Wilbarger County, Texas, United States. It is located four nautical miles (5 mi, 7 km) north of the central business district of Vernon, Texas. This airport is included in the National Plan of Integrated Airport Systems for 2011–2015, which categorized it as a general aviation facility.

History 
Activated on September 23, 1942, as Vernon Airport. Conducted basic AAF flying training until inactivated March 31, 1945. Primary use was basic flying training of military flight cadets. Flying training was performed with Fairchild PT-19s as the primary trainer. Also had several PT-17 Stearmans and a few P-40 Warhawks assigned. Also was an auxiliary to Frederick Army Airfield, Oklahoma.

Transferred to Army Corps of Engineers on May 5, 1945.  The airfield was turned over to civil control in February 1947 though the War Assets Administration.

At some point a large hangar was relocated from the nearby Victory Field onto the airport. It served the dual purpose of transient hangar and Terminal until 1974 when a new terminal building was constructed. The hangar is still used for transient aircraft storage.

Facilities and aircraft 
Wilbarger County Airport covers an area of 600 acres (243 ha) at an elevation of 1,265 feet (386 m) above mean sea level. It has two asphalt paved runways: 2/20 is 5,099 by 100 feet (1,554 x 30 m) and 16/34 is 4,304 by 80 feet (1,312 x 24 m).

For the 12-month period ending July 10, 2008, the airport had 9,100 aircraft operations, an average of 24 per day: 99% general aviation and 1% military. At that time there were 20 aircraft based at this airport: 75% single-engine, 20% multi-engine, and 5% ultralight.

See also 

 Texas World War II Army Airfields
 List of airports in Texas

References 

 
 Manning, Thomas A. (2005), History of Air Education and Training Command, 1942–2002.  Office of History and Research, Headquarters, AETC, Randolph AFB, Texas 
 Shaw, Frederick J. (2004), Locating Air Force Base Sites, History’s Legacy, Air Force History and Museums Program, United States Air Force, Washington DC.

External links 
 Aerial image as of December 1994 from USGS The National Map
 
 

Airports in Texas
Buildings and structures in Wilbarger County, Texas
Transportation in Wilbarger County, Texas
Airfields of the United States Army Air Forces in Texas
USAAF Contract Flying School Airfields
Airports established in 1942
1942 establishments in Texas